Mianchi South railway station is a railway station located in Mianchi County, Henan, China. It was opened on 6 February 2010, along with the Zhengzhou–Xi'an high-speed railway.

References

Railway stations in Henan
Stations on the Xuzhou–Lanzhou High-Speed Railway
Railway stations in China opened in 2010